The BL O-series engine is a straight-4 automobile engine family that was produced by the Austin-Morris division of British Leyland (BL) as a development of the BMC B-series engine family. (See also another B-series successor, the BMC E-series engine.)

Introduced by BL in 1978 in the rear wheel drive Series 3 Morris Marina and the smaller engined versions of the front-wheel-drive Princess, it was intended to replace the 1.8 L B-series unit. The main advance over the B series was that the new unit was of belt driven overhead camshaft configuration, with an aluminium cylinder head.

Design
Offered in the unusual capacity of 1.7 L as well as 2.0 L, it proved to be reliable and was widely used in BL vehicles. These included the rear wheel drive Morris Ital of 1980 (1.7 L or 2.0 L with an automatic gear box), the rear wheel drive Rover SD1 of 1982 (2.0 L only), and 1.7 L and 2.0 L in the front wheel drive Austin Ambassador – in fact the only engine offered in this model. In 1984, it was reworked for installation in high specification 2.0 L versions of the front-wheel drive Austin Maestro and Austin Montego, where it was later optionally available with fuel injection or turbo-charging. This installation of the O-series was adapted for use with the Honda PG-1 end-on manual gearbox, replacing the gearbox-in-sump design traditionally used on British Leyland front-wheel-drive products. The 1.7 L O-series was not used in these vehicles, which featured R- and later S-series 1.6 L units instead. The cylinder blocks of the later transverse and earlier longitudinally mounted versions of the engine are not however interchangeable owing to differences in the gearbox mounting flange.

A notable advantage of the 2-litre, petrol O-series engine is that the cylinder head does not require modification to run on unleaded petrol due to having hardened valve seats. Other O-series engines, however, cannot run on unleaded without modification of the cylinder head or use of an additive.

By 1987, British Leyland (now known as the Rover Group) equipped the O-series with a 16-valve cylinder head for the Rover 800. This 2.0 L unit was known as the M series, and was further reworked into the T series in 1992. The 8-valve version of the O-series was also briefly used in budget versions of the Rover 800, although confusingly this was given the "M8" designation in official Rover service publications – implying it was an 8-valve version of the M Series engine, although it was identical to the O series used in the Maestro and Montego.

Diesel versions
In 1986, BL collaborated with Perkins to convert the O-series to run on diesel. The oil-burning versions, known as the Rover MDi or Perkins Prima, proved to be highly successful in the Maestro and Montego, and helped sustain the ailing mid-sized models into the 1990s. Perkins successfully marketed the engine under its own brand in the industrial and marine sectors. 

Examples of vehicles using a version of the O-series engine:

Austin Maestro 2.0 L, 2.0 L Diesel
Austin Montego 2.0 L, 2.0 L Diesel
Leyland Sherpa/Freight Rover Sherpa/200/300 1.7 L, 2.0 l
Princess / Austin Ambassador 1.7 L, 2.0 L
Morris Ital 1.7 L, 2.0 L automatic
Morris Marina 1.7 L
Rover SD1 2.0 L
Rover 820 2.0 L
MG Maestro 2.0 L
MG Maestro 2.0 L, turbo
MG Montego 2.0 L
MG Montego 2.0 L, turbo
Naylor/Hutson TF 1700

References

 O-series engine story

O
BMC engines
Gasoline engines by model
Straight-four engines